For Freedom is a 1918 American silent drama film directed by Frank Lloyd and starring William Farnum, Coit Albertson, and Rubye De Remer.

Cast
 William Farnum as Robert Wayne 
 Coit Albertson as Herbert Osborne 
 Rubye De Remer as Mary Fenton 
 Anna Lehr as Edith Osborne 
 J. Herbert Frank as Howard Stratton 
 G. Raymond Nye as Bill Harris 
 John Slavin as The Weazel 
 Marc B. Robbins as David Sterling

References

Bibliography
 Solomon, Aubrey. The Fox Film Corporation, 1915-1935: A History and Filmography. McFarland, 2011.

External links

1918 films
1918 drama films
Silent American drama films
Films directed by Frank Lloyd
American silent feature films
1910s English-language films
Fox Film films
American black-and-white films
1910s American films